Pauline von Königsegg (1830–1912), was an Austrian court official.

Early life 
Pauline Marie was born as younger daughter of Count August von Bellegarde (1795-1873) and his wife, Baroness Julia von Gudenus (1795-1865). She was paternal granddaughter of Count Heinrich von Bellegarde, who served as Viceroy of Lombardy-Venetia.

Court life 
She was the lady in waiting to Empress Elisabeth of Austria, later promoted to the position of Oberhofmeisterin. She was a favorite and confidant of the empress. Pauline was awarded with an Order of the Starry Cross.

Personal life 
On 15 April 1857 in Vienna, she married Count Alfred zu Königsegg-Aulendorf (1817-1898). They had one son:

 Count Franz Xaver zu Königsegg-Aulendorf (1858-1927); married Countess Hedwig von Neipperg (1859-1916) and had issue.

References 

1830 births
1912 deaths
Austrian ladies-in-waiting